Pemba may refer to:


Places
 Pemba Island, in Tanzania
 Pemba, Mozambique, the capital of Cabo Delgado Province
 Pemba, Zambia, a small town

Individuals
 George Pemba, South African painter
 Pemba (panda), a red panda
Tsewang Yishey Pemba, Tibetan doctor

Other
 Pemba (chalk), a chalk used in Afro-Brazilian religions
 Pemba, a genus of south American bush crickets in the tribe Teleutiini

See also
 Pemba Airport (disambiguation)